The 1884 United States presidential election in Wisconsin was held on November 4, 1884 as part of the 1884 United States presidential election. State voters chose 11 electors to the Electoral College, who voted for president and vice president.

Republican Party candidate James G. Blaine won Wisconsin with 50.38 percent of the popular vote, winning the state's eleven electoral votes.

Results

Results by county

See also
 United States presidential elections in Wisconsin

References

Wisconsin
1884 Wisconsin elections
1884